Serious may refer to:

 Seriousness, an attitude of gravity, solemnity, persistence, or earnestness
 Serious (TV series), a BBC children's television show

Albums
 Serious (Luther Allison album) or the title song, 1987
 Serious (Whitehead Bros. album) or the title song, 1994

Songs
 "Serious" (Duran Duran song), 1990
 "Serious" (Gwen Stefani song), 2004
 "Serious", by Alice Cooper from From the Inside, 1978
 "Serious", by Donna Allen, 1986
 "Serious", by Duffy from Rockferry, 2008
 "Serious", by E-40 from Revenue Retrievin': Graveyard Shift, 2011
 "Serious", by Five from Invincible, 1999
 "Serious", by Jasmine V, 2010
 "Serious", by Jme
 "Serious", by Scars on Broadway from Scars on Broadway, 2008

See also
 
 Sirius (disambiguation)